The 2001 Alabama Crimson Tide football team represented the University of Alabama during 2001 NCAA Division I-A football season.  They began their season trying to improve upon a 3–8 (3–5) record during the 2000 season. This was the team's 69th season in the SEC.  This marked Dennis Franchione's first  season as head coach of the Crimson Tide following the dismissal of Mike DuBose.  The team finished with a victory in the 2001 Independence Bowl and an overall record of 7–5.

Recruiting class

Schedule

Source: Rolltide.com All-time Football Results: 2001 Season

Rankings

Roster

Coaching staff

Game summaries

UCLA

Dennis Franchione's first game as Alabama's head coach pitted the Crimson Tide against the Bruins of the Pacific-10 Conference. ESPN's College Gameday was in Tuscaloosa for the first time ever (they had previously visited Alabama home games at Legion Field in Birmingham). Although Alabama outgained UCLA in total offense 458–291, the Bruins were victorious by a final score of 20–17 before a sold-out home crowd. The Tide took an early 10–0 lead on a 78-yard Antonio Carter touchdown reception from Tyler Watts and 30-yard Neal Thomas field goal. UCLA responded with 20 consecutive points to take a lead that would not be relinquished. The final Alabama score came late in the fourth on a 71-yard touchdown pass from Andrew Zow to Freddie Milons.

Vanderbilt

Dennis Franchione notched his first win as head coach of the Crimson Tide, in a game of field goals, and defeated Vanderbilt 12–9.

Arkansas

As a result of the September 11 Attacks, the September 15, 2001, contest with Southern Miss was postponed, resulting in the Razorbacks being the Tide's third opponent on the season. Although outgained in total offense, a pair of defensive touchdowns put the Tide over the top before an emotional home crowd 31–10. Bama would score its first points on an 11-yard Ahmaad Galloway touchdown run to take a 7–3 lead in the first quarter. In the second, the teams would alternate touchdowns with Reggie Myles scoring on a 42-yard fumble recovery for the Tide and Brandon Holmes scoring on a 1-yard run to have Bama leading 14–10 at the half. The Tide would open their second half scoring with a 36-yard Neal Thomas field goal followed by a 39-yard Freddie Milons touchdown reception from Tyler Watts. The final points of the evening would come with only 00:20 remaining in the game when Thurman Ward returning an interception 60-yards for a touchdown.

South Carolina

Although the Tide gained 516 yards of total offense, the Gamecocks prevailed by a final score of 37–36. The South Carolina victory marked their first victory over Alabama in school history.

UTEP

The Tide gained 588 yards of total offense, and defeated the Miners by a final score of 56–7 in the first Legion Field game of the 2001 season. Bama scored 21 points in first on a pair of Donnie Lowe touchdown runs (2 and 1 yard respectively) and a 10-yard Triandos Luke touchdown reception from Tyler Watts. Another 21 points were scored in the second on a pair of Watts touchdown runs (16 and 9 yard respectively) and a 2-yard Luke touchdown reception to give Bama a 42–0 halftime lead. The scoring continued in the second half on a 12-yard Marvin Brown touchdown run and 2-yard Ray Hudson touchdown run. This was the most points Alabama had scored in a game since 1993 vs. Louisiana Tech (56-3).

Ole Miss

Thirteen unanswered points in the fourth resulted in the Rebels defeating the Tide before the home crowd by a final score of 27–24. Bama scored first on a 6-yard Ahmaad Galloway touchdown run, only to have Ole Miss take the lead after touchdown runs on a 1-yard Toward Sanford run and 25-yard Joe Gunn run. The Tide responded with a 58-yard Sam Collins touchdown reception from Tyler Watts and 31 yard Neal Thomas field goal to take a 17–14 halftime lead.

Alabama extended their lead to 24–14 in the third on a 7-yard Triandos Luke touchdown reception. Ole Miss would respond with a 19-yard Charles Stackhouse touchdown run and Eli Manning hitting Gunn for a 3-yard touchdown pass to seal the victory  with 00:46 remaining in the game. For the game, Ole Miss outgained the Tide 430–363 in total offense.

Tennessee

Although Alabama took a 24–21 lead into the fourth quarter, 14 unanswered points in the fourth resulted in Bama losing its seventh consecutive contest to the Vols in the annual Third Saturday in October game. After falling behind 14–3 on a 21-yard pass from Casey Clausen to Donté Stallworth and a 60-yard Travis Stephens run, the Tide responded with a pair of Sam Collins touchdown receptions to take a 17–14 lead.

The Vols responded and took a 21–17 lead following a 21-yard Jason Witten touchdown reception, only to again fall behind 24–21 after a four-yard Ahmaad Galloway touchdown run. Tennessee again came from behind and dominated the fourth quarter and seal the victory with a one-yard Clausen and one-yard Stephens touchdown runs in the fourth.

LSU

On Homecoming in Tuscaloosa, LSU dominated in gaining 611 yards of total offense (with a record 528 yards through the air) and defeated the Tide 35–21. LSU took a 14–0 lead in the first quarter on a 3-yard LaBrandon Toefield run and a 34-yard touchdown pass from Rohan Davey to Jerel Myers. Bama responded in the second with a 22-yard Neal Thomas field goal and 5-yard touchdown pass from Tyler Watts to Terry Jones, Jr. to make the score to 14–10 at the half.

Early in the third, Toefield again scored on a two-yard run to give the Tigers a 21–10 lead. Bama tied the game at 21 after another Thomas field goal and 22-yard Watts touchdown run. LSU responded and scored on a 25-yard Josh Reed touchdown reception late in the third and on a 6-yard Toefield touchdown run in the fourth. Reed's 293 yards receiving set a SEC record for receiving yardage in a game.

Mississippi State

Bama put an end to a three-game losing streak and defeated the Bulldogs of Mississippi State 24–17 before the home crowd. The Tide took a 10–0 lead late into the second quarter on a 6-yard Santonio Beard touchdown run and 20-yard Neal Thomas field goal. The Bulldogs answered, and scored the next 17 points on a pair of Kevin Fant touchdown passes and a 43-yard John M. Marlin field goal to take a 17–10 lead into the fourth quarter. In the fourth, Andrew Zow hit Donnie Lowe for a 10-yard touchdown strike to tie the game at 17, with Beard scoring his second touchdown on a game-winning, 14-yard run.

Auburn

On The Plains, Alabama outgained the Tigers in total offense 549–272 and secured the Tide's upset victory at Auburn 31–7 in the 2001 Iron Bowl. After a scoreless first, Bama scored first on an eight-yard Santonio Beard touchdown run. Auburn answered with their lone score on a 5-yard Ronnie Brown run. The Tide scored next with Andrew Zow connecting with Jason McAddley for a 45-yard touchdown strike to give the visitors a 14–7 lead at the half.

The second half again saw the Tide strike early on a 47-yard Beard run, with the final scores coming in the fourth on a 10-yard Terry Jones, Jr. touchdown reception and a 26-yard Neal Thomas field goal. Although slightly outgained in passing yardage 221–231, Bama outrushed the Tigers 328–41 to give Alabama the 31–7 victory.

Southern Miss

The contest against the Golden Eagles was originally to have been played on September 15, 2001; however, as a result of the September 11 attacks, the game was postponed and subsequently played on November 29, a Thursday night, at Legion Field. Although mired in rainy and windy conditions, both Ahmaad Galloway (on runs of 40 and 11 yards respectively) and Andrew Zow (on a 14-yard pass to Sam Collins, and a 26-yard pass to Freddie Milons) each notched a pair of touchdowns in the victory.

Iowa State

In the 26th annual Independence Bowl, the Tide struggled against the Cyclones offensively and were outgained 456 yards of offense to 269, but a missed 47-yard field goal attempt with 46 seconds left in the game sealed the victory for Alabama.

Statistics

Team

Scores by quarter

Offense

Rushing

Passing

Receiving

References

Alabama
Alabama Crimson Tide football seasons
Independence Bowl champion seasons
Alabama Crimson Tide football